The modern-day countries of Bosnia and Herzegovina and Serbia both originated from Yugoslavia. The majority of population in both countries speak one of the standard varieties of Serbo-Croatian and Serbia is one of the largest investors in Bosnia and Herzegovina.

Both countries are full members of the Council of Europe, the Organization for Security and Co-operation in Europe (OSCE), the Central European Free Trade Agreement (CEFTA) and are official candidate states for membership of the European Union.

History

The beginnings of formal cooperation can be traced to the Bosnian War; Republika Srpska got support from Serbia. At the Dayton Agreement, the President of the Republic of Serbia Slobodan Milošević represented the Bosnian Serb interests due to absence of Radovan Karadžić. The agreement ensured the right for entities in Bosnia and Herzegovina to establish special parallel relationships with neighboring countries consistent with sovereignty and territorial integrity of Bosnia and Herzegovina. The agreement on Special Parallel Relations was signed on February 28, 1997 and implemented December 15, 2010.

On July 8, 2015, Russia vetoed a United Nations Security Council resolution that would have condemned the Srebrenica massacre as a genocide. Lobbied by the Republika Srpska and Serbia, the veto was praised by Serbian President Tomislav Nikolić stating that Russia had "prevented an attempt of smearing the entire Serbian nation as genocidal" and proven itself as a true and honest friend.

Invited by the Bosnian government to attend the annual Srebrenica Genocide Memorial, Serbian Prime Minister Aleksandar Vučić accepted, travelling to Srebrenica on 11 July 2015 to pay his respect. He was attacked by a mob in the crowd with stones, bottles and other objects and had to flee the premise.

In February 2021, Serbia donated 5.000 of their vaccines to Bosnia and Herzegovina.

Geography
The two countries are located in the western Balkans and Southeastern Europe. They share 357 km of land boundary, partly (206 km) along the Drina.

Economy
Serbia is the second top investor in Bosnia and Herzegovina, according to data spanning May 1994–December 2013.

Culture
Serbs and Bosniaks ethnolinguistically belong to the South Slavic peoples.

The majority of population in Serbia and Bosnia and Herzegovina speak Serbo-Croatian. One of its standard varieties, Serbian, is official in both countries. Bosnian and Croatian, the other varieties of Serbo-Croatian official in Bosnia and Herzegovina, are recognized as minority languages of Serbia.

Demographics

Serbs in Bosnia and Herzegovina

Serbs are one of the three constituent peoples of Bosnia and Herzegovina along with Bosniaks and Croats. They are the second largest ethnic group, numbering 1,086,733 (30.78%) according to the 2013 census. The community is concentrated in Republika Srpska (numbering 970,857; 82.95%), one of two entities making up BiH. Serbs are predominantly members of the Serbian Orthodox church.

Bosniaks in Serbia

Bosniaks are a recognized minority of Serbia. They are the fourth largest ethnic group after Serbs, Hungarians and Roma, numbering 145,278 (2.02%) according to the 2011 census. The community is concentrated in the region of Sandžak in southwestern Serbia. Bosniaks are predominantly of Sunni Muslim faith.

Resident diplomatic missions
 Bosnia and Herzegovina has an embassy in Belgrade.
 Serbia has an embassy in Sarajevo and consulates-general in Banja Luka and Mostar and consular offices in Drvar and Trebinje.

See also

 Foreign relations of Bosnia and Herzegovina
 Foreign relations of Serbia
 Bosnia and Herzegovina–Kosovo relations
 Agreement on Succession Issues of the Former Socialist Federal Republic of Yugoslavia

References

 
Serbia
Bilateral relations of Serbia